Sardegna Uno is an Italian television owned and operated by 7 Gold, located in Cagliari, Sardinia.

External links
www.sardegna1.it

Italian companies established in 1984
Television channels and stations established in 1984
Sardinia
Television channels in Italy
Mass media in Cagliari